Room 222 is an American comedy-drama television series produced by 20th Century Fox Television that aired on ABC for 112 episodes,  from September 17, 1969 until January 11, 1974. The show was broadcast on Wednesday evenings at 8:30 (EST) for its first two seasons, before settling into Friday evenings at 9:00, following The Brady Bunch and The Partridge Family, and preceding The Odd Couple and Love, American Style.

In 1970, Room 222 earned the Primetime Emmy Award for Outstanding New Series, while Michael Constantine and Karen Valentine won for Outstanding Supporting Actor in a Comedy Series and Outstanding Supporting Actress in a Comedy Series, respectively.

Overview

While the series primarily focuses on an American history class in Room 222 at the fictional Walt Whitman High School, in Los Angeles, California,  it also depicts other events in and outside the school, such as the home lives of the racially diverse student body and faculty. 

The history class is taught by Pete Dixon (Lloyd Haynes), an idealistic African-American teacher. Other characters featured in the show include:the school's compassionate guidance counselor, Liz McIntyre (Denise Nicholas), who is also Pete's girlfriend; the dryly humorous school principal, Seymour Kaufman (Michael Constantine); the petite and enthusiastic Alice Johnson (Karen Valentine), who is initially a student teacher, later full-time teacher whom Pete mentors; and Principal Kaufman's secretary Miss Hogarth, played by Patsy Garrett.  Additionally, many recurring students are featured from episode to episode.

Pete Dixon delivers gentle lessons in tolerance and understanding to his students.and they admire his wisdom, insight, and easygoing manner. The themes of the episodes are sometimes topical, reflecting the contemporary political climate of the late 1960s and early-to-mid1970s, such as the Vietnam War, women's rights, race relations, and Watergate. However, most plots are timeless and feature themes still common to modern-day teenagers. For example, the 1969 episode "Funny Boy" deals with a class clown who is self-conscious about being overweight.  In the 1971 episode "What Is a Man?," a student is a mistaken victim of anti-gay harassment, while the 1974 episode "I Didn't Raise My Girl to Be a Soldier" delves into parent–teenage child issues.

Cast

Main cast
Lloyd Haynes as Mr. Pete Dixon, the protagonist, teaches 11th grade American History in room 222 of Walt Whitman High School
Denise Nicholas as Miss Liz McIntyre, guidance counselor at Whitman, dating Pete
Michael Constantine as Mr. Seymour Kaufman, the principal of Whitman, preoccupied with his duties but dryly humorous
Karen Valentine as Miss Alice Johnson, a student teacher learning from Pete

Recurring cast
 Ramon Bieri as Mr. Gil Casey, vice principal
 Howard Rice as Richie Lane, the "brainy" kid in the class
 Heshimu Cumbuka as Jason Allen, the "tough guy" of the class
 Eve McVeagh as Madge Morano, Mrs Cates, PTA Member
 Eric Laneuville as Larry
 Ta-Tanisha as Pamela, the "popular girl" of the class
 Judy Strangis as Helen Loomis, the "quiet kid" of the class
 David Jolliffe as Bernie, the school's sports star
 Bruno Kirby as Herbie Constadine
 Patsy Garrett as Miss Hogarth
 Ivor Francis as Mr. Kenneth Dragen
 Helen Kleeb as Miss Tandy

Episodes

Background

The program was filmed at 20th Century Fox studios. Exterior shots of Los Angeles High School were shown behind the opening credits and for some outdoor scenes in the early seasons. 
Room 222'''s initial episodes garnered weak ratings, and ABC was poised to cancel the program after one season. However, the show earned several nominations at the 1970 Emmy Awards, and ABC relented. In the spring of 1970, Room 222 won Emmy Awards for Best New Series; Best Supporting Actor (Michael Constantine); and Best Supporting Actress (Karen Valentine). The following year, Constantine and Valentine were again nominated in the supporting acting awards category. After the shaky first season, Room 222 nevertheless managed to receive respectable ratings during its next three years. Ratings peaked during the 1971–72 season, during which it held a #28 viewership ranking. By the start of the 1973–74 season, ratings had fallen drastically, and ABC canceled the show at mid-season. After the series ended, the program entered syndication and was rerun on several television stations throughout the United States.

The theme song was written by composer Jerry Goldsmith, written in a 7/4 time signature. 7/4 is, itself, uncommon, but Goldsmith's theme subdivides the meter as 4+3/3+4, 3+4/4+3. His theme and two episode scores for the series ("Richie's Story" (the pilot) and "The Flu") were later issued by Film Score Monthly on an album with his score for the film Ace Eli and Rodger of the Skies.

The show draws some comparisons to a theatrical movie which premiered during the show's first season, Halls of Anger. In that movie, a new, black teacher joins a southern California high school; an attractive, sympathetic black female member of staff shows romantic interest; a militant black student is frequently involved in situations; issues of racism and integration are featured. The film and television show also share actors (Ta-Tanisha, Helen Kleeb, Rob Reiner). However, while Room 222 is a comedy drama, milder in tone, Halls of Anger is purposefully aggressive, using deliberately controversial language and some forceful violence to highlight the real and dangerous potential of unresolved racial conflict.

Books and comics
A series of novels based on characters and dialog of the series was written by William Johnston and published by Tempo Books in the early 1970s. Dell Comics published a comic book for four issues during 1970 and 1971.

Home media
Shout! Factory has released the first two seasons of Room 222'' on DVD in Region 1. As of 2022, these releases have been discontinued and are out of print. It is unknown if the remaining three seasons will be released.

See also

White savior § Appearance in television

References

External links

 
 Room 222 overview from KFCPlainfield
 Room 222 at The Museum of Broadcast Communications
 Room 222 opening credits and theme song on YouTube

1969 American television series debuts
1974 American television series endings
1960s American comedy-drama television series
1970s American comedy-drama television series
1960s American high school television series
1970s American high school television series
1960s American workplace comedy television series
1970s American workplace comedy television series
American Broadcasting Company original programming
222
American high school films
Television series by 20th Century Fox Television
Television shows set in Los Angeles
English-language television shows
Television series about educators
Television series created by James L. Brooks